The Princess Grace Foundation – USA is a charity organization named after Princess Grace of Monaco, which supports emerging performers in theater, dance, and film in the form of awards, grants, scholarships, and fellowships. The Foundation holds an annual awards ceremony to recognize fledgling and established artists across the country. Prince Albert II of Monaco serves as its patron.

History

The Foundation was established by Prince Rainier III of Monaco to honor the legacy of the late Princess Grace, who supported Monégasque arts in culture as well as numerous up-and-coming American artists during her lifetime. 
In 1982, Robert Hausman, founding Chairman, incorporated Princess Grace Foundation-USA as a non-profit public charity. The Board of Trustees at the time of its founding consisted of Frank Sinatra, Cary Grant, Roger Moore, John Johnson, William P. Rogers, Mary Wells Lawrence, and Lynn Wyatt.

The first financial grants in the form of scholarships, apprenticeships, and fellowships were awarded in 1984 to artists associated with schools or performing arts companies in the dance and theater. An arts advisory board composed of professionals in each of those fields was appointed to the Awards recipients. President Ronald Reagan, and First Lady Nancy Reagan oversaw the first gala at the White House in Washington, D.C.; The Foundation has continued with annual Awards Galas, rotating between New York City, Los Angeles and Monte Carlo.  Currently, there are five avenues of funding for Award winners, available exclusively to Award winners and honoraria: Special Projects, Works in Progress in partnership with Baryshnikov Arts Center, Choreography Mentorship Co-Commission, Professional Development, and Professional Development partnerships for filmmakers.

The Princess Grace Awards
The Princess Grace Awards are a ceremony held each year, hosted by the Princely Family of Monaco and the Princess Grace Foundation-USA, to recognize emerging and established artists in the performing arts. The five nomination categories include theater, playwriting, dance, choreography, and film.

The Princess Grace Statue Award
The Princess Grace Statue Awarded is the foundation's highest honor, received by artists who distinguish themselves in their respective disciplines after receiving a previous Princess Grace Award.  In addition to a $25,000 cash gift, the awardees are presented with a bronze statuette of Princess Grace created by the Dutch artist Kees Verkade. To date, sixty-seven artists have received this award. As of 2020, sixty-seven artists have received this award, including Oscar Isaac, John M. Chu, Leslie Odom Jr., Chinonye Chukwu, Gillian Murphy, David Hallberg, Anna D. Shapiro, and Rose Bond.

The Prince Rainier III Award
The Prince Rainier III Award was inaugurated in 2005, after the passing of Prince Rainier. The Award is presented to established artists who are both highly celebrated in their careers and have made significant humanitarian contributions to their fields. The Award includes a grant to the philanthropic organization of the honorees's choice. Recipients to date include George Lucas, Glenn Close, Denzel Washington, Julie Andrews, Dick Van Dyke, Robert Redford, Queen Latifah and James Cameron.

Notable Princess Grace Awards Winners

Theater

 
 Jared Mezzocchi, 2012 Theater Fellowship
 Nicolette Robinson, 2009 Theater Scholarship, Gant Gaither Theater Award 
 Scott Turner Schofield, 2007 Theater Fellowship - Acting, 2009 Special Project Award
 Oscar Isaac, 2004 Theater Scholarship
 Sam Gold, 2004 Theater Scholarship, 2018 Statue Award 
 Leslie Odom Jr., 2002 Theater Scholarship, 2016 Statue Award 
 Richard Kimmel, 2000 Theater Fellowship
 Anna Shapiro, 1996 Theater Apprenticeship, 2010 Statue Award
 Michael John Garcés, 1995 Theater Fellowship, 2007 Statue Award 
 Eric Simonson, 1994 Theater Fellowship, 2005 Statue Award
 David Barrera, 1993 Theater Scholarship
 David Neumann, 1993 Theater Apprenticeship, 2011 Works in Progress Residency
 Paul Tazewell, 1993 Theater Fellowship, 2004 Statue Award

 Shishir Kurup, 1993 Theater Apprenticeship
 Donna Lynne Champlin, 1992 Theater Scholarship
 Michael Wilson, 1992 Theater Fellowship, 2001 Statue Award
 Ricardo Hernandez, 1992 Theater Apprenticeship, 2000 Statue Award 
 Ty Taylor, 1990 Theater Scholarship
 Yareli Arizmendi, 1990 Theater Scholarship, 1995 Statue Award
 Christopher Ashley, 1989 Theater Apprenticeship, 1998 Statue Award
 Orlagh Cassidy, 1989 Theater Scholarship
 Bruce Graham, 1988 Theater Fellowship, 1991 Statue Award 
 Tina Landau, 1988 Theater Scholarship, 1999 Statue Award
 Patrick Page, 1988 Theater Fellowship
 Anthony Kushner, 1987 Theater Fellowship, 1994 Statue Award
 Paul Warner, 1986 Theater Apprenticeship, 1987 Statue Award

Playwriting

 Kenneth Lin, 2005 Playwriting Fellowship
 Jesse Kellerman, 2003 Playwriting Fellowship
 Madeleine George, 2002 Playwriting Fellowship
 Sheila Callaghan, 2000 Playwriting Fellowship, 2008 Works in Progress Residency

 Bridget Carpenter, 1997 Playwriting Fellowship
 Adam Rapp, 1999 Playwriting Fellowship, 2006 Statue Award
 Kate Robin, 1995 Playwriting Fellowship, 2003 Statue Award

Dance

Jacqueline Green, 2014 Dance Fellowship
 Isabella Boylston, 2009 Dance Fellowship
 Jeffrey Cirio, 2009 Dance Fellowship
 Joseph Walsh, 2009 Dance Fellowship
 Alexander Peters, 2008 Ballet Scholarship
 Blaine Hoven, 2008 Ballet Fellowship
 Jermel Johnson, 2008 Ballet Fellowship
 Lucien Postlewaite, 2008 Ballet Fellowship
 Andrew Bartee, 2007 Dance Scholarship - Ballet
 Brooklyn Mack, 2007 Dance Fellowship - Ballet
 Sarah Kathryn Lane, 2007 Dance Fellowship - Ballet
 Adrienne Benz, 2006 Dance Fellowship - Ballet
 Drew Jacoby, 2005 Dance Fellowship, 2008 Special Project Award
 John Lam, 2005 Dance Fellowship
 Tiler Peck, 2004 Dance Scholarship
 Christine Shevchenko, 2003 Dance Scholarship
 David Hallberg, 2002 Dance Fellowship
 Michele Jimenez, 2002 Dance Fellowship
 Jared Angle, 2001 Dance Fellowship
 Gonzalo Garcia, 2000 Dance Fellowship
 Lilyan Vigo-Ellis, 2000 Dance Fellowship, 2004 Special Project Grant
 Michele Wiles, 1999 Dance Fellowship

 Gillian Murphy, 1998 Dance Fellowship, 2009 Statue Award
 Maria Bystrova-Renko, 1998 Dance Scholarship
 Alexandra Ansanelli, 1997 Dance Fellowship
 Miranda Weese, 1995 Dance Fellowship
 Carlos Acosta, 1995 Dance Fellowship
 Maria Kowroski, 1994 Dance Scholarship, 2006 Statue Award
 Dormeshia Sumbry-Edwards, 1994 Dance Fellowship, 2017 Statue Award 
 Derick Grant, 1993 Emerging Dance Artist
 Robert Battle, 1993 Dance Scholarship, 2007 Statue Award
 Jennie Renee Somogyi, 1992 Dance Scholarship, 2002 Statue Award
 Riolama Lorenzo, 1992 Dance Scholarship
 Ethan Stiefel, 1991 Emerging Dance Artist, 1999 Statue Award
 Kristin Long, 1990 Emerging Dance Artist
 Pauline Reyniack, née Golbin, 1990 Emerging Dance Artist, 1991 Statue Award
 Tina LeBlanc-Jerkunica, 1988 Dance Fellowship, 1995 Statue Award
 Elizabeth Walker, 1988 Dance Scholarship
 Diane Madden, 1986 Dance Fellowship, 1994 Statue Award
 Terese Capucilli, 1985 Dance Scholarship, 1986 Statue Award
 Li Cunxin, 1986 Dance Fellowship, 1993 Statue Award
 Amanda McKerrow, 1986 Dance Fellowship, 1987 Statue Award

Choreography

 Olivier Wevers, 2011 Choreography Fellowship
 Zoe Scofield, 2011 Choreography Fellowship
 Kyle Abraham, 2010 Dance-Choreography Fellowship

 Kate Weare, 2009 Choreography Fellowship
 Camille A. Brown, 2006 Choreography Fellowship - Modern

Film

 Chinonye Chukwu, 2009 Film Scholarship, 2019 Statue Award 
 Ben Steinbauer, 2006 Graduate Film Scholarship
 Cary Joji Fukunaga, 2005 Graduate Film Scholarship
 Ben Russell, 2002 Graduate Film Scholarship, 2010 Special Project Grant
 Ham Tran, 2001 Graduate Film Scholarship, 2006 Special Project Grant
 Jon M. Chu, 2001 Film Scholarship, 2011 Statue Award 
 David Riker, 1995 Graduate Film Scholarship, 2001 Statue Award

 Ilya Chaiken, 1994 Undergraduate Film Scholarship, 2003 Statue Award
 Parine Jaddo, 1993 Graduate Film Scholarship
 Mark Christopher, 1992 Graduate Film Scholarship, 2005 Statue Award
 Rose Bond, 1989 Graduate Film Scholarship, 2008 Statue Award
 Eric Darnell, 1989 Graduate Film Scholarship
 Stephen Hillenburg, 1991 Graduate Film Scholarship, 2002 Statue Award
 Gregory Mottola, 1989 Graduate Film Scholarship, 1998 Statue Award

References

External links
 
 
 Grace Influential on Instagram

Arts organizations based in New York City
Arts foundations based in the United States
 Princess Grace Awards
Internship programs
Arts organizations established in 1982
1982 establishments in the United States
Grace Kelly